The World Series Cricket Australia XI was a cricket team representing Australia in World Series Cricket (WSC). Their first game was against the WSC West Indies in 1977. World Series Cricket ended in 1979 after the Australian XI tour to the West Indies. The side was made up of current Australian international cricketers and some recently retired former Test players. The side was captained by Ian Chappell who had recently retired from first-class and international cricket, but returned to captain the side.

Players

Honours
 Runners-up 1977/78 International Cup
 Runners-up 1978/79 Supertest Series
 Runners-up 1978/79 International Cup

Records (Supertests)

Highest team total

Most wickets

Best bowling
Note: 5 wickets in an innings listed.

Most runs in the tournament

Highest individual scores
Note: Only top five scores listed.

Record against opponents

Supertests

One Day Games

See also
World Series Cricket results
World Series Cricket player records
WSC West Indies XI
WSC Rest Of The World XI
WSC Cavaliers XI

Australia XI
Cricket teams in Australia
Australia in international cricket
1977 establishments in Australia